Rúben da Rocha Rodrigues (born 2 August 1996) is a Portuguese football player who plays as a forward for  club Notts County. Besides the Netherlands, he has played in England.

Club career
He played in the Netherlands since the junior levels and started his career in the lower divisions.

On 27 December 2017, Den Bosch announced that Rodrigues will join the club for training immediately and he also signed a professional contract with a beginning date of 1 July 2018. He previously played for Den Bosch's junior squad.

He made his Eerste Divisie debut for Den Bosch on 17 August 2018 in a game against Volendam as a 61st-minute substitute for Stefano Beltrame. On 23 January 2019, Rodrigues was loaned out to De Treffers for the rest of the season.

On 7 August 2020, he signed for National League side Notts County. After scoring seven goals in the month, Rodrigues was awarded the league's Player of the Month award for May 2021.

Career statistics

Honours

Individual
National League Player of the Month: May 2021
Notts County F.C. Player of the Year: 2020–21

References

External links
 

1996 births
People from Oliveira de Azeméis
Living people
Portuguese footballers
Association football forwards
FC Den Bosch players
De Treffers players
Notts County F.C. players
Eerste Divisie players
Tweede Divisie players
National League (English football) players
Portuguese expatriate footballers
Expatriate footballers in the Netherlands
Portuguese expatriate sportspeople in the Netherlands
Expatriate footballers in England
Portuguese expatriate sportspeople in England
Sportspeople from Aveiro District